Karol Beck and Jaroslav Levinský were the defending champions, but Levinský chose to not participate.
Beck partnered up by Jiří Krkoška. They lost in the final 6–1, 6–7(2), [8–10], against Jonathan Marray and Jamie Murray.

Seeds

Draw

Draw

External links
Main Draw

Internazionali di Tennis di Bergamo Trofeo Trismoka - Doubles
2010 Doubles